U.S. Route 641 (US 641) is a U.S. Route in Tennessee and Kentucky. While it is considered a spur route of U.S. Route 41, the two routes no longer connect.

Route description

Tennessee
US 641 begins at an intersection with  US 64 south of Clifton. North of that city, it runs concurrently with  SR 69. US 641 intersects  US 412 in Parsons,  I-40 near Holladay, and  US 70 in Camden. In Paris, US 641 intersects  US 79; it also separates from SR 69 and begins a concurrency with  SR 54 that it maintains until the Kentucky state line.

Kentucky
US 641 enters Kentucky at Hazel and continues north to Murray, intersecting  KY 80 just north of the city limit. Near Benton, a spur route (Spur US 641) provides access to  I-69 (the Purchase Parkway) while the main route travels through the city. US 641 has a concurrency with  US 62 beginning near Calvert City; the routes cross  I-24 / I-69 before separating in Eddyville. The route intersects  KY 70 in Fredonia. The US 641 designation ends at  US 60 in Marion.

History
U.S. Route 641 was designated by AASHO in 1951 out of a desire on the part of Indiana, Kentucky and Tennessee highway officials to create a single numbered route to connect Memphis, Tennessee to Evansville, Indiana via the popular tourist attraction Kentucky Dam.  In 1968, the 4.9-mile Indiana portion of its route was relinquished. Indiana highway officials, in their request to decommission the route, advised that 641 "serves no useful purpose" and had, indeed, not been marked in Evansville for "a number of years."

Its northern section from Marion to Henderson, Kentucky, which was concurrent with U.S. Route 60, was eliminated and its northern terminus has since remained Marion.  In 1977, US 641 was extended southward along the path of Tennessee State Route 69 to its interchange with I-40 (Exit 126) near Holladay, Tennessee with SR 69 continuing south beyond the interchange.

In November 2014, the American Association of State Highway and Transportation Officials approved a southern extension of the US 641 designation along SR 69 and SR 114, from the former southern terminus at I-40 to the current end at US 64 in Wayne County.

Major intersections
The mileposts listed in the following table is only an estimated calculation. Actual mile markers may vary.

Special routes
Two special routes of U.S. Route 641 currently exist, and a third has existed in the past, all of which have been in Kentucky.

Murray business loop

US Route 641 Business is a business route of US Route 641 located mainly along the east side of Murray, Kentucky, in Calloway County. It follows Kentucky Route 121 east from US 641 along Glendale Road until KY 121 turns south along South Fourth Street, where US BUS 641 turns north.  The route makes a sharp left turn at Chestnut Street and heads west before finally terminating at US 641.

Benton spur route

US Route 641 Spur is a spur route of US Route 641 located on the south side of Benton, Kentucky, in Marshall County in western Kentucky's Jackson Purchase region. It begins at a junction with US 641 south of Benton, and ends at the Exit 41 interchange with Interstate 69 (formerly the Julian M. Carroll Purchase Parkway).

Benton truck route

References

External links

US 641 at Kentucky Roads
US 641 at US Ends

41-6
41-6
41-6
6
0641
0641
0641
0641
0641
0641
641
641
641
641
41-6